Elise Leapai (born 16 October 1979) is a Samoan Australian former professional boxer. His career highlight was a fight against Wladimir Klitschko in 2014, for the WBA (Super), IBF, WBO, IBO, The Ring magazine and lineal heavyweight titles.

Early life
Leapai's parents, Faataui and Leitu, moved their family from Laulii, Samoa when he was 7 to New Zealand, where they lived until he was 12. In New Zealand, Leapai attended Owairaka Primary School in Mt Albert and played rugby league for Marist Saints, as did his one-time sparring partner Sonny Bill Williams. Upon moving to Australia, Leapai's family settled in Logan, Queensland. In Logan, Leapai played junior rugby league for Logan Brothers alongside future Australian rugby league and rugby union international Lote Tuqiri. While playing for Brothers, Leapai was offered a scholarship with the National Rugby League side, the North Queensland Cowboys.

Leapai has four brothers, Leati, Stefano and Faatni (known as Leroy), who spent four years with the London Broncos in the Super League. His cousin is Australia and Queensland representative Josh Papalii.

Professional career
Alex Leapai defeated Denis Boytsov on 23 November 2013 in Germany.  Boytsov was the WBO's mandatory challenger for Klitschko, but when Leapai defeated Boytsov, Leapai was named mandatory challenger even though the Boytsov-Leapai bout was not an official elimination bout.

Dan Rafael for ESPN.com reported on 3 February 2014 that "Heavyweight champion Wladimir Klitschko will make his 16th title defense when he faces Alex Leapai, one of his mandatory challengers, on 26 April in at the König-Pilsener-Arena in Oberhausen, Germany, as K2 Promotions announced Monday. The Klitschko and Leapai camps had agreed to a deal several weeks ago, which allowed them to avoid a purse bid, but it has now been signed. Leapai (30-4-3, 24 KOs), 34, a native of Samoa living in Australia, came out of nowhere to be appointed as the mandatory challenger by the WBO after scoring a major upset."

Leapai vs. Wladmir Klitschko 

Despite the fact that Klitschko possessed an overwhelming advantage over his challenger, the Ukrainian was quoted as saying the bout was  "the most important fight of my career" due to the political backdrop of the encounter from a Ukrainian point of view. Early in 2014 Russia took the Crimea from the Ukraine and consequently, both nations were mobilising for the possibility of war in the short term. Vladmir's brother Vitali Klitschko was preparing to run for the Ukrainian presidency in looming May elections and the 37-year-old title holder admitted boxing was second in his mind to the political upheaval in his homeland. As the fight Klitschko claimed the spectacle would be ever important to "boost the morale" of his countrymen.

Former world heavyweight champion Shannon Briggs interrupted a pre-fight press conference in Germany just days before the anticipated bout. Briggs challenged Klitschko for a fight and accused Leapai of being an unworthy opponent for Klitschko.

Leapai was knocked out by Klitschko in the fifth round of a fight scheduled for 12 rounds. Leapai was knocked down barely more than a minute into the bout. Klitschko retained his IBF, WBA, WBO and IBO championship belts and used his height and reach advantage to control the fight with Leapai. Leapai reportedly rattled his opponent once in the fight before Klitschko responded with a flurry of blows that eventually dropped the Australian to the canvas.

Career after world title shot

In his next fight, Leapai fought Malik Scott. Leapai lost the fight via unanimous decision, losing 100-90, 99-91 and 98-92 on the scorecards.

On two weeks notice, Alex Leapai took a fight against former WBO champion Joseph Parker (boxer) after his deal with Eric Molina fell through during the signing stages. Leapai went on to lose after a tenth-round stoppage. Despite protests from Leapai, the referee Ricky Gonzalez stopped the fight after Parker landed seven straight punches to the head of his opponent.

Personal life
Leapai is married to his high school sweetheart, Theresa, and has six children. Four daughters (Cyanne, Maria, Menime and Ivona) and two sons (Alex and EJ).

In 2005, Leapai spent six months in Queensland's Woodford Correctional Centre on a grievous bodily harm charge after attacking two bouncers.

An avid rugby league fan, Leapai supports the Brisbane Broncos. Leapai's inspiration is fellow Samoan heavyweight boxer David Tua.

Professional boxing record

Minor titles won
WBO Asia Pacific heavyweight title
WBO Oriental heavyweight title
IBF Australasian heavyweight title
OPBF heavyweight title

References

External links

1979 births
Samoan male boxers
Samoan expatriates in Australia
Living people
Heavyweight boxers
People from South East Queensland
Sportspeople from Logan, Queensland
Australian sportspeople of Samoan descent
Australian male boxers
People from Tuamasaga